Vitus Lake is a lake in Alaska. It is named for Vitus Bering, leader of the 1741 expedition to Alaska. Vitus Lake forms the southern limit of the Bering Lobe, outlets via the Seal River to the Gulf of Alaska.

Legends
It is also allegedly home to Vittie, a cryptid and local legend. The name Vittie is a derivation of the name Nessie, the cryptid allegedly living in Loch Ness.

References

Lakes of Alaska
Bodies of water of Yakutat City and Borough, Alaska